Anti Social Social Club (sometimes stylized as ASSC and AntiSocialSocialClub) is a Los Angeles-based streetwear brand founded by Andrew Buenaflor, who goes by the pseudonym Neek Lurk. As of May 2022, the brand is wholly owned by Marquee Brands.

Anti Social has collaborated with A Bathing Ape, Rimowa, Dover Street Market, Playboy, Hello Kitty, Hot Wheels, DHL, Formula 1, FaZe Clan, Goodsmile Racing and Gran Turismo.

History

Anti Social Social Club was founded in 2015 through Twitter. It releases limited collections each year. The inspiration for creating this brand came from the founder's mental health struggle at age 27. Lurk used his brand as an emotional outlet for his depression. The first product was a basic hat with the logo on the side. Shortly after its founding, ASSC became a popular trend. Some notable celebrities have worn this brand such as Kanye West, BTS, and Kim Kardashian.

See also
A Bathing Ape
Billionaire Boys Club (clothing retailer)
Virgil Abloh
OVO
The Hundreds
Freshjive
Stüssy
Highsnobiety

References

External links 
 

2010s fashion
Clothing companies established in 2015
Clothing brands of the United States
Culture of Los Angeles
Hip hop fashion
Street fashion
FaZe Clan